FC Dnipro-75 Dnipropretrovsk is a youth football school of Dnipro Dnipropetrovsk.

History
In late 2000s as a professional football team based in Dnipropetrovsk, Ukraine it competed at the Ukrainian Second League, but was expelled from the PFL after not paying the spring 2010 playing dues.

Dnipro-75 Dnipropretrovsk entered the professional competition in 2008. The team grew from their successful youth sports school that was opened in 1975. The team became sponsored by the building company DYK which invested in forming a professional team in Dnipropetrovsk. Dnipro-75 Dnipropetrovsk  competed in the Druha Liha B. They temporarily played at nearby Pavlohrad while their original stadium was closed.

League and cup history

{|class="wikitable"
|-bgcolor="#efefef"
! Season
! Div.
! Pos.
! Pl.
! W
! D
! L
! GS
! GA
! P
!Domestic Cup
!colspan=2|Europe
!Notes
|-
|align=center|2008–09
|align=center|3rd "B"
|align=center|16
|align=center|34
|align=center|8
|align=center|6
|align=center|20
|align=center|28
|align=center|56
|align=center|24
|align=center|1/64 finals
|align=center|
|align=center|
|align=center|–6
|-
|align=center|2009–10
|align=center|3rd "B"
|align=center|13
|align=center|26
|align=center|4
|align=center|5
|align=center|17
|align=center|19
|align=center|21
|align=center|14
|align=center|1/64 finals
|align=center|
|align=center|
|align=center bgcolor=pink|–3 – Expelled
|}

See also
 FC Dnipro-2 Dnipropetrovsk

Notes and references

External links
  Official website of club

Defunct football clubs in Ukraine
FC Dnipro
2007 establishments in Ukraine
2010 disestablishments in Ukraine
Football clubs in Dnipro
Association football clubs established in 2007
Association football clubs disestablished in 2010